The Roman Catholic Diocese of Maintirano is a Latin Catholic suffragan diocese in the ecclesiastical province of the Metropolitan Roman Catholic Archdiocese of Antananarivo (national capital), one of five on Madagascar), yet it remains in the jurisdiction of the missionary Roman Congregation for the Evangelization of Peoples.

Its cathedral episcopal see is the Cathédrale de l’Assomption, dedicated to the Assumption of Mary, in Maintirano, Mahajanga Province.

History 
.Established on 8 February 2017, as the Diocese of Maintirano, on canonical territories split off from Diocese of Tsiroanomandidy (also in the Ecclesiastical province of Antananarivo), the Roman Catholic Diocese of Mahajanga (Ecclesiastical Province of Antsiranana) and the Diocese of Morondava (Ecclesiastical Province of Toliara).

Episcopal Ordinaries 
(Roman Rite; so far missionary European members of a Latin congregation)

Suffragan Bishops of Maintirano
 Gustavo Bombin Espino, Trinitarians (O.SS.T.) (born in Spain) (2017.02.08 – ...), previously Bishop of co-mother-see Tsiroanomandidy (Madagascar) (2003.10.04 – 2017.02.08).

See also 
 List of Catholic dioceses in Madagascar

References

Sources and external links 
 GCatholic, with Google satellite photo

Roman Catholic dioceses in Madagascar
Roman Catholic Ecclesiastical Province of Antananarivo